Brandon Bryant may refer to:
Brandon Bryant (American football) (born 1995), American football safety
Brandon Bryant (whistleblower) (born 1985), American soldier